Mastika or mastiha is a liqueur seasoned with  mastic, a resin with a slightly pine or cedar-like flavor gathered from the mastic tree, a small evergreen tree native to the Mediterranean region. In Greece, mastiha or mastichato is a sweet liqueur produced with the mastika resin from the Greek island of Chios, which is distilled after hardening to crystals. Sugar is typically added. It is a sweet liqueur that is typically consumed at the end of a meal. It has a distinctive flavor, reminiscent of pine and herbs. It is claimed to have medicinal properties and to aid digestion.

In August of 2012, wildfires spread across the island of Chios, scorching 31,480 acres of land, and destroying more than half of the island's mastic orchards. Because the product has a “protected designation of origin” from the European Union, the fire not only impacted local Chios farmers, who lost approximately 60 percent of their crops, but also derailed the global supply of the product.

Chios Mastiha

Chios Mastiha Liqueur is a liqueur flavoured with mastic distillate or mastic oil from the island of Chios. The name Chios Mastiha has protected designation of origin status in the European Union. Chios Mastiha liqueur is clear with a sweet aroma. It is traditionally served cold.

Production
The process is regulated by Greek law and includes the flavouring of alcohol with mastic oil by agitation or the distillation of mastic with alcohol. The solution is then diluted with water and sweetened with sugar. The final alcoholic strength by volume of Chios Mastiha must be at least 15%.

Flavouring

The only flavouring agents used in Chios Mastiha liqueur are an alcoholic distillate of mastic or mastic oil made from Chios mastic. Mastic is the hardened sap harvested from the mastic tree, Pistacia lentiscus var chia, a small evergreen shrub that grows on rocky terrain on the southern part of the island. Chios mastic is certified by the Agricultural Products Certification and Supervision Organization as part of the Hellenic Ministry of Rural Development and Food. The island's mastic production is controlled by a co-operative of medieval villages, the Mastichochoria.

Producers and distributors

Chios
The Growers' Spirit is a producing company run by the Chios Gum Mastic Growers Association (CGMGA). The CGMGA offers Mastiha liqueur made with both mastic distillate and mastic oil in two different variants: Kentos (20% alcohol) and Enosis (30% alcohol). 
Stoupakis Chios Distillery produces Homeric Mastiha, which contains mastic distillate.
Tetteris Distillery is one of the oldest producers of mastiha liqueur. Tetteris traditional distillery was founded in 1912. Before the company foundation, Stylianos Tetteris was producing and selling ouzo infused with mastic, for exportation. In 1954, Eleftherios Tetteris, seeing the tendency of the consumer public towards local liqueurs, and having studied oenology in France, was the first to experiment in the production of Mastic liqueur by distilling grains in a special way, and developed a special method (that only the Tetteri distillery knows and uses until today), taking natural distillate, and then with the addition of alcohol and sugar, produced the Mastic liqueur.

Wider Greece
Skinos, based in Athens.
Finest Roots, based in Kalamata, produces Roots Mastic and Roots Mastic Vintage Strength.  
Mavrakis, based in Patra.
D'ARGO Distillery, based in Athens, produces CHANDOLIA Mastic Liqueur by 100% Distillate

United States
Mastrogiannis Mastiha
Ambrosia Group, based in Miami, produces FOS Greek Mastiha.
YA Mastiha

History
Mastic has been harvested for at least 2,500 years since Greek antiquity. The first mention of actual mastic 'tears' was by Hippocrates. Hippocrates used mastic for the prevention of digestive problems, colds and as a breath freshener. Roman emperors used mastic along with honey, pepper, and egg in the spiced wine  conditum paradoxum. Digestive liqueurs, similar to Mastiha but made with grapes, were known as the Greek elixirs before the French Revolution.

Influence in literature 
Greek writer and journalist Zoe Rapti, released a novel titled "Έρωτας με Λικέρ Μαστίχα" (Love with Mastic Liqueur), in 2013. The book is in development to become a film. Attached composers are the Spanomarkou Sisters (Areti & Ioanna Spanomarkou), whose paternal grandmother was born in Chios.

See also 
 Greek cuisine
 Greek food products

References 

Anise liqueurs and spirits
Bulgarian distilled drinks
Distilled drinks
Macedonian distilled drinks
Greek distilled drinks
Greek products with protected designation of origin
Greek words and phrases
Mastic